Roni Levy may refer to:

 Ronny Levy (born 1966), former Israeli international football player
 Roni Levi, French photographer, killed by police at Bondi Beach